American Scout Seamount appeared on charts of the North Atlantic Ocean published during the 1950s. It was located near  with a depth of 37 meters. Investigations by the Woods Hole Oceanographic Institution research vessel Atlantis II in 1964 found no evidence that it existed. Extensive surveys by the U.S. Naval Oceanographic Office eventually disproved the existence of a seamount in the vicinity. A June 1966 bathymetric and magnetic survey by the new survey ship  found no evidence of a seamount with no soundings less than  but did find strong returns from the Deep Scattering Layer that could be mistaken for shoals.

References

Seamounts of the Atlantic Ocean
Phantom islands of the Atlantic